The 1976 United States presidential election in California took place on November 2, 1976 as part of the 1976 United States presidential election. State voters chose 45 representatives, or electors, to the Electoral College, who voted for president and vice president.

California narrowly voted for the Republican incumbent, Gerald Ford, over the Democratic challenger, Jimmy Carter.

Ford won the state with a plurality of 49.35% of the vote to Carter's 47.57%, a victory margin of 1.78%, which made California almost 4% more Republican than the nation-at-large.

Carter is the last Democrat to carry the counties of Amador, El Dorado, Lassen, Madera, Placer, Shasta, Sierra and Yuba, and the last to win a majority of the vote in Del Norte, Plumas, Stanislaus, and Tehama. Carter is also the last candidate from either party to carry Los Angeles by only a plurality, while Ford is the last Republican to win a majority of the vote in Marin (Ronald Reagan later won that county by plurality in 1980). This also remains the last election in which a Republican presidential candidate won at least 40% of the vote in San Francisco, and the last time that county was not the most Democratic in the state. This is also the last time when California would back a losing Republican candidate and the last time that the state would vote Republican in a close election. The state would not vote for a losing candidate again until 2000, and for the loser of the popular vote until 2004.

Results

Results by county

References

California
1976
Presidential election